Papillion Middle School is a middle school in Papillion, Nebraska, United States, which currently holds 7th grade and 8th grade. The school building was opened in 1957 as Papillion High School, which relocated to its present site in north Papillion in August 1971.

Background
The school is the oldest building in the Papillion-La Vista School District. It has many tornado shelters.

Academics
The 7th grade classes are split into 3 teams, team A, team B, and team C, while The 8th grade classrooms are split into 2 teams. Each team has a name that refers to what the students are learning in social studies that year. The core classes, yearly classes that are not electives, include mathematics, social studies, English, science and (in 7th grade) reading.

History 
Papillion public schools date back to September 1876. Originally housed in a single brick building at the corner of Halleck and Adams Streets, Papillion's only school served students in all 12 grades. In 1893 the school moved to a new brick building at 420 S. Washington Street (the present site of the district offices). The city continued to grow, and in February 1957, Papillion High School opened in a new building across Washington Street (presently Papillion Jr. High) to students in grades 7-12. The high school moved out of the building to its present site (Papillion-La Vista) in north Papillion in August 1971.

On February 17, 1966 the original Papillion School, built in 1893, was razed to make room for the new junior high school, which was opened in 1967. Nine years later, a new junior high was built in neighboring La Vista to help ease crowding at the current school. Before a new high school was opened, these two junior highs both enrolled ninth grade students. Currently ninth graders attend both high schools, although more go to Papillion South High School. The school's original boundary was Papio Creek; today it is the city limits.

Athletics 
Papillion Junior High offers activities such as football, basketball, wrestling, cross country, track, and volleyball.

See also
 Papillion La Vista Senior High School
 Papillion La Vista South High School

References

External links 
 Papillion Junior High School official website

Public middle schools in Nebraska
Educational institutions established in 1967
Schools in Sarpy County, Nebraska